Rudawa is a small river in Lesser Poland Voivodeship, Poland. It is a tributary of the Vistula river. Rudawa joins Vistula in Kraków near the district of Zwierzyniec. Through the city, the flow of the river is controlled by artificial embankments. Rudawa is also one of the sources of drinking water in Kraków with the water intake located in Mydlniki.

Every year, at the mouth of Rudawa River, there is a spring festival organized during Easter holidays. The river flows through picturesque landscape featuring some of the more interesting geological and geomorphological Jurassic park areas, including Tenczyński Scenic Park, 11 km West of Kraków.

General information 
 Length: 35.4 km
 Watershed area: 318.3 km²
 Main settlements:  Krzeszowice, Rudawa, Zabierzów, Kraków. 
 Larger tributaries: Będkówka, Kobylanka, Kluczwoda, Wierzchówka, Potok Olszanicki.

See also 
 Rivers of Poland

References 

Rivers of Poland
Rivers of Lesser Poland Voivodeship